Michael Chack (born August 25, 1971) is an American former competitive figure skater. He won gold medals at four senior international events, Nebelhorn Trophy, Karl Schäfer Memorial, Piruetten, and Winter Universiade, and one bronze, at the 1994 Trophée de France. Chack also won one senior national medal, bronze at the 1993 U.S. Championships. After his performance was skipped by the broadcaster, his surname became part of figure skating's colloquial vocabulary, e.g. "to chack" meaning to omit a good performance from a television broadcast.

Chack withdrew from the 1994 U.S. Championships due to a groin pull and a stress fracture in his right leg. He was coached by Peter Burrows for 14 years and by Frank Carroll for five years. After retiring from competition in 1999, he began touring with Holiday on Ice.

Results

References

External links

 Michael Chack at Frogs on Ice

American male single skaters
Universiade medalists in figure skating
Living people
1971 births
Sportspeople from Toms River, New Jersey
Universiade gold medalists for the United States
Competitors at the 1991 Winter Universiade
20th-century American people
21st-century American people